Autumn House Press is an independent, non-profit literary publishing company based in Pittsburgh, Pennsylvania, United States.

History

Autumn House Press was founded in 1998 by Michael Simms when prominent American publishers, driven by economic concerns, dramatically reduced their poetry lists. As a result, influential contemporary poets were left struggling to find publishers. Over time, Autumn House started publishing fiction and nonfiction titles as well. Since its founding, Autumn House has published over 100 titles, including full-length collections of poetry, short stories, and essays as well as memoirs, novels, anthologies, and poetry chapbooks, most of which are still in print.

In 2016, founder and then editor-in-chief Michael Simms retired after 18 impressive years. Christine Stroud took on the role of editor in chief and Melissa Becker became board president.

Books and Authors

The press publishes books of poetry, fiction, and nonfiction by such authors as Chad Abushanab, Ellery Akers, Beth Alvarado, George Bilgere, Chana Bloch, Andrew Bourelle, Harrison Candelaria Fletcher, Sherrie Flick, Frank X. Gaspar, Andrea Hollander, Dickson Lam, Danusha Laméris, Ada Limón, Ed Ochester, Steven Schwartz, Cherene Sherrard, Gerald Stern, and Patricia Jabbeh Wesley. Other prominent Autumn House authors include  Sheryl St. Germain, who was named the Louisiana Writer of the Year in 2018, and Cameron Barnett, who received the Carol R. Brown Creative Achievement Awards for Emerging Artist and whose debut collection, The Drowning Boy's Guide to Water, was a finalist for the NAACP Image Award.

Autumn House Press's other especially notable titles include Anxious Attachments by Beth Alvarado and Not Dead Yet and Other Stories by Hadley Moore, both of which were longlisted for the PEN America Literary Awards in Nonfiction Essays and Debut Short Story Collections, respectively. Anxious Attachments was also awarded the Oregon Book Award in 2020. In 2013, Clifford Thompson's Love for Sale and Other Essays won the Whiting Foundation Award.

The press also publishes comprehensive anthologies including New America: Contemporary Literature for a Changing Society and When She Named Fire: An Anthology of Contemporary Poetry by American Women.

Autumn House Press titles have been reviewed in such venues as Publishers Weekly, Booklist, The Georgia Review, The Hollins Critic, The Times Literary Supplement, and the Washington Independent Review of Books. Poems and excerpts have been featured in venues such as The New York Times Magazine, The Slowdown, American Life in Poetry, Lit Hub, The Millions, and Cleveland Review of Books. The press was featured on Ploughshares as part of their "Indie Spotlight" interview series.

Coal Hill Review

Michael Simms and Joshua Storey founded the Coal Hill Review in 2007. The journal published poetry by both emerging and established writers and took its name from Coal Hill, otherwise known as Mount Washington, in Pittsburgh. From 2009 to 2018, Coal Hill also published print poetry chapbooks.

In early 2017, the Autumn House staff began working to reimagine and redefine the journal. Beginning in November of 2018, Coal Hill became a triannual, multi-genre literary journal that offers a greater representation of Pittsburgh authors.

Prizes

Autumn House holds annual contests in poetry, fiction, and nonfiction; the winners of which receive publication of a full-length manuscript a $1,000 advance against royalties, and a $1,500 travel/publicity grant to promote their book. Previous fiction winners include Michael X. Wang's Further News of Defeat: Stories and Sharma Shields's Favorite Monster. Melissa Wiley won the nonfiction prize in 2019 for Skull Cathedral: A Vestigial Anatomy, and poetry winners include lucky wreck by Ada Limón, The Moons of August by Danusha Laméris, and makalani bandele's under the aegis of a winged mind, most recently.

The press additionally awards the "Rising Writer Prize" in poetry and, beginning in 2021, in fiction. The prizes are awarded for first full-length books of by authors 36 years old or younger and are aimed at supporting the work of younger, less-established writers who will become the voices of an emerging generation. Winners receive publication and a cash prize. Previous winners include Dennis James Sweeney's In the Antarctic Circle, Eric Tran's The Gutter Spread Guide to Prayer, and Cameron Barnett's The Drowning Boy's Guide to Water.

Autumn House additionally holds an annual chapbook contest which offers publication and a $1,000 advance against royalties. Previous winners of the Autumn House (formerly Coal Hill Review) Chapbook Contest include Epithalamia by Erinn Batykefer.

References

External links
 

Book publishing companies based in Pennsylvania
Culture of Pittsburgh
Non-profit organizations based in Pittsburgh
Publishing companies established in 1998